Robin Hood is a CD containing the incidental music soundtrack to the BBC television series Robin Hood. Composed by Andy Price, the music is performed by the Danubia Symphony Orchestra and was performed at the Budapest Opera House, production of the series having been based near Budapest. The CD was released mid-way through the programme's first series in November 2006.

References 

Album
Television soundtracks
Depictions of Robin Hood in music
2006 soundtrack albums